Joué-lès-Tours (literally Joué near Tours) is a commune in the Indre-et-Loire department in central France.

It is the largest suburb of the city of Tours, and is adjacent to it on the southwest.

Population

Toponymy
The name of Joué-lès-Tours appears in its form "Gaudiacus" in the 6th Century. It corresponds to a toponymic type frequently found in Christian Gaule, that gave different variants depending on the region: Joué (west of France), Jouy (center and north), Jouey (east), Gouy (Normandy/Picardy), Gaugeac, Jaujac (south). It is composed of the Christian name "Gaudius", meaning "fortunate", "blessed" (gaudia > joy, in Latin) and with the Gallo-Roman suffix -ACU, meaning "place of", "property of".

History
Joué-lès-Tours was the site of the 20 December 2014 Tours police station stabbing.

Controversy
In February 2010 the mayor, Philippe Le Breton, added the word laïcité underneath the French national motto on the town hall's façade. The Muslim community of Joué-lès-Tours felt they were being "caricatured".

See also
Communes of the Indre-et-Loire department
2014 Tours police station stabbing

References

External links

Official website 

Communes of Indre-et-Loire